Illinois is a state in the Midwestern United States. It shares borders with Wisconsin to its north, Iowa to its northwest, Missouri to its southwest, Kentucky to its south, and Indiana to its east. Its largest metropolitan areas include the Chicago metropolitan area, and the Metro East section, of Greater St. Louis. Other metropolitan areas include Peoria and Rockford, as well as Springfield, its capital. Of the fifty U.S. states, Illinois has the fifth-largest gross domestic product (GDP), the sixth-largest population, and the 25th-largest land area.

Illinois has a highly diverse economy, with the global city of Chicago in the northeast, major industrial and agricultural hubs in the north and center, and natural resources such as coal, timber, and petroleum in the south. Owing to its central location and favorable geography, the state is a major transportation hub: the Port of Chicago has access to the Atlantic Ocean through the Great Lakes and Saint Lawrence Seaway and to the Gulf of Mexico from the Mississippi River via the Illinois Waterway. Additionally, the Mississippi, Ohio, and Wabash rivers form parts of the state's boundaries. Chicago's O'Hare International Airport has been among the world's ten busiest airports for decades. Illinois has long been considered a microcosm of the United States and a bellwether in American culture, exemplified by the phrase Will it play in Peoria?.

What is now Illinois was inhabited for thousands of years by various indigenous cultures, including the advanced civilization centered in the Cahokia region. The French were the first Europeans to arrive, settling near the Mississippi River in the 17th century, in the region they called Illinois Country, as part of the sprawling colony of New France. Following U.S. independence in 1783, American settlers began arriving from Kentucky via the Ohio River, and the population grew from south to north. Illinois was part of the United States' oldest territory, the Northwest Territory, and in 1818 it achieved statehood. The Erie Canal brought increased commercial activity in the Great Lakes, and the small settlement of Chicago became one of the fastest growing cities in the world, benefiting from its location as one of the few natural harbors in southwestern Lake Michigan. The invention of the self-scouring steel plow by Illinoisan John Deere turned the state's rich prairie into some of the world's most productive and valuable farmland, attracting immigrant farmers from Germany and Sweden. In the mid-19th century, the Illinois and Michigan Canal and a sprawling railroad network greatly facilitated trade, commerce, and settlement, making the state a transportation hub for the nation.

By 1900, the growth of industrial jobs in the northern cities, and coal mining in the central and southern areas, attracted immigrants from Eastern and Southern Europe. Illinois became one of America's most industrialized states and remains a major manufacturing center. The Great Migration from the South established a large community of African Americans, particularly in Chicago, who founded the city's famous jazz and blues cultures. Chicago became a leading cultural, economic, and population center and is today one of the world's major commercial centers; its metropolitan area, informally referred to as Chicagoland, holds about 65% of the state's 12.8 million residents. 
 
Three U.S. presidents have been elected while living in Illinois: Abraham Lincoln, Ulysses S. Grant, and Barack Obama; additionally, Ronald Reagan was born and raised in the state. Today, Illinois honors Lincoln with its official state slogan Land of Lincoln, which has been displayed on its license plates since 1954. The state is the site of the Abraham Lincoln Presidential Library and Museum in Springfield and the future home of the Barack Obama Presidential Center in Chicago.

Etymology

"Illinois" is the modern spelling for the early French Catholic missionaries and explorers' name for the Illinois Native Americans, a name that was spelled in many different ways in the early records.

American scholars previously thought the name Illinois meant 'man' or 'men' in the Miami-Illinois language, with the original  transformed via French into Illinois. The name  has also been said to mean 'tribe of superior men', which is a false etymology. The name Illinois derives from the Miami-Illinois verb  'he speaks the regular way'. This was taken into the Ojibwe language, perhaps in the Ottawa dialect, and modified into  (pluralized as ). The current spelling form, Illinois, began to appear in the early 1670s, when French colonists had settled in the western area.

History

Pre-European 

American Indians of successive cultures lived along the waterways of the Illinois area for thousands of years before the arrival of Europeans. The Koster Site has been excavated and demonstrates 7,000 years of continuous habitation. Cahokia, the largest regional chiefdom and Urban Center of the Pre-Columbian Mississippian culture, was located near present-day Collinsville, Illinois. They built an urban complex of more than 100 platform and burial mounds, a  plaza larger than 35 football fields, and a woodhenge of sacred cedar, all in a planned design expressing the culture's cosmology. Monks Mound, the center of the site, is the largest Pre-Columbian structure north of the Valley of Mexico. The finely crafted ornaments and tools recovered by archaeologists at Cahokia include elaborate ceramics, finely sculptured stonework, carefully embossed and engraved copper and mica sheets, and one funeral blanket for an important chief fashioned from 20,000 shell beads. These artifacts indicate that Cahokia was truly an urban center, with clustered housing, markets, and specialists in toolmaking, hide dressing, potting, jewelry making, shell engraving, weaving and salt making.

The civilization vanished in the 15th century for unknown reasons, but historians and archeologists have speculated that the people depleted the area of resources. Many indigenous tribes engaged in constant warfare. According to Suzanne Austin Alchon, "At one site in the central Illinois River valley, one third of all adults died as a result of violent injuries." The next major power in the region was the Illinois Confederation or Illini, a political alliance. As the Illini declined during the Beaver Wars era, members of the Algonquian-speaking Potawatomi, Miami, Sauk, and other tribes including the Fox (Meskwaki), Iowa, Kickapoo, Mascouten, Piankeshaw, Shawnee, Wea, and Winnebago (Ho-Chunk) came into the area from the east and north around the Great Lakes.

European exploration and settlement prior to 1800

French explorers Jacques Marquette and Louis Jolliet explored the Illinois River in 1673. Marquette soon after founded a mission at the Grand Village of the Illinois in Illinois Country. In 1680, French explorers under René-Robert Cavelier, Sieur de La Salle and Henri de Tonti constructed a fort at the site of present-day Peoria, and in 1682, a fort atop Starved Rock in today's Starved Rock State Park. French Empire Canadiens came south to settle particularly along the Mississippi River, and Illinois was part of first New France, and then of La Louisiane until 1763, when it passed to the British with their defeat of France in the Seven Years' War. The small French settlements continued, although many French migrated west to Ste. Genevieve and St. Louis, Missouri, to evade British rule.

A few British soldiers were posted in Illinois, but few British or American settlers moved there, as the Crown made it part of the territory reserved for Indians west of the Appalachians, and then part of the British Province of Quebec. In 1778, George Rogers Clark claimed Illinois County for Virginia. In a compromise, Virginia (and other states that made various claims) ceded the area to the new United States in the 1780s and it became part of the Northwest Territory, administered by the federal government and later organized as states.

19th century

Prior to statehood

The Illinois-Wabash Company was an early claimant to much of Illinois. The Illinois Territory was created on February 3, 1809, with its capital at Kaskaskia, an early French settlement.

During the discussions leading up to Illinois's admission to the Union, the proposed northern boundary of the state was moved twice. The original provisions of the Northwest Ordinance had specified a boundary that would have been tangent to the southern tip of Lake Michigan. Such a boundary would have left Illinois with no shoreline on Lake Michigan at all. However, as Indiana had successfully been granted a  northern extension of its boundary to provide it with a usable lakefront, the original bill for Illinois statehood, submitted to Congress on January 23, 1818, stipulated a northern border at the same latitude as Indiana's, which is defined as 10 miles north of the southernmost extremity of Lake Michigan. However, the Illinois delegate, Nathaniel Pope, wanted more, and lobbied to have the boundary moved further north. This shift added  to the state, including the lead mining region near Galena. More importantly, it added nearly 50 miles of Lake Michigan shoreline and the Chicago River. Pope and others envisioned a canal that would connect the Chicago and Illinois rivers and thus connect the Great Lakes to the Mississippi.

The State of Illinois prior to the Civil War

In 1818, Illinois became the 21st U.S. state. The capital remained at Kaskaskia, headquartered in a small building rented by the state. In 1819, Vandalia became the capital, and over the next 18 years, three separate buildings were built to serve successively as the capitol building. In 1837, the state legislators representing Sangamon County, under the leadership of state representative Abraham Lincoln, succeeded in having the capital moved to Springfield, where a fifth capitol building was constructed. A sixth capitol building was erected in 1867, which continues to serve as the Illinois capitol today.

Though it was ostensibly a "free state", there was nonetheless slavery in Illinois. The ethnic French had owned black slaves since the 1720s, and American settlers had already brought slaves into the area from Kentucky. Slavery was nominally banned by the Northwest Ordinance, but that was not enforced for those already holding slaves. When Illinois became a state in 1818, the Ordinance no longer applied, and about 900 slaves were held in the state. As the southern part of the state, later known as "Egypt" or "Little Egypt", was largely settled by migrants from the South, the section was hostile to free blacks. Settlers were allowed to bring slaves with them for labor, but, in 1822, state residents voted against making slavery legal. Still, most residents opposed allowing free blacks as permanent residents. Some settlers brought in slaves seasonally or as house servants. The Illinois Constitution of 1848 was written with a provision for exclusionary laws to be passed. In 1853, John A. Logan helped pass a law to prohibit all African Americans, including freedmen, from settling in the state.

The winter of 1830–1831 is called the "Winter of the Deep Snow"; a sudden, deep snowfall blanketed the state, making travel impossible for the rest of the winter, and many travelers perished. Several severe winters followed, including the "Winter of the Sudden Freeze". On December 20, 1836, a fast-moving cold front passed through, freezing puddles in minutes and killing many travelers who could not reach shelter. The adverse weather resulted in crop failures in the northern part of the state. The southern part of the state shipped food north, and this may have contributed to its name, "Little Egypt", after the Biblical story of Joseph in Egypt supplying grain to his brothers.

In 1832, the Black Hawk War was fought in Illinois and present-day Wisconsin between the United States and the Sauk, Fox (Meskwaki), and Kickapoo Indian tribes. It represents the end of Indian resistance to white settlement in the Chicago region. The Indians had been forced to leave their homes and move to Iowa in 1831; when they attempted to return, they were attacked and eventually defeated by U.S. militia. The survivors were forced back to Iowa.

By 1839, the Latter Day Saints had founded a utopian city called Nauvoo, formerly called Commerce. Located in Hancock County along the Mississippi River, Nauvoo flourished and, by 1844, briefly surpassed Chicago for the position of the state's largest city. But in that same year, the Latter Day Saint movement founder, Joseph Smith, was killed in the Carthage Jail, about 30 miles away from Nauvoo. Following a succession crisis, Brigham Young led most Latter Day Saints out of Illinois in a mass exodus to present-day Utah; after close to six years of rapid development, Nauvoo quickly declined afterward.

After it was established in 1833, Chicago gained prominence as a Great Lakes port, and then as an Illinois and Michigan Canal port after 1848, and as a rail hub soon afterward. By 1857, Chicago was Illinois's largest city. With the tremendous growth of mines and factories in the state in the 19th century, Illinois was the ground for the formation of labor unions in the United States.

In 1847, after lobbying by Dorothea L. Dix, Illinois became one of the first states to establish a system of state-supported treatment of mental illness and disabilities, replacing local almshouses. Dix came into this effort after having met J. O. King, a Jacksonville, Illinois businessman, who invited her to Illinois, where he had been working to build an asylum for the insane. With the lobbying expertise of Dix, plans for the Jacksonville State Hospital (now known as the Jacksonville Developmental Center) were signed into law on March 1, 1847.

Civil War and after

During the American Civil War, Illinois ranked fourth in soldiers who served (more than 250,000) in the Union Army, a figure surpassed by only New York, Pennsylvania, and Ohio. Beginning with President Abraham Lincoln's first call for troops and continuing throughout the war, Illinois mustered 150 infantry regiments, which were numbered from the 7th to the 156th regiments. Seventeen cavalry regiments were also gathered, as well as two light artillery regiments. The town of Cairo, at the southern tip of the state at the confluence of the Mississippi and Ohio Rivers, served as a strategically important supply base and training center for the Union army. For several months, both General Grant and Admiral Foote had headquarters in Cairo.

During the Civil War, and more so afterwards, Chicago's population skyrocketed, which increased its prominence. The Pullman Strike and Haymarket Riot, in particular, greatly influenced the development of the American labor movement. From Sunday, October 8, 1871, until Tuesday, October 10, 1871, the Great Chicago Fire burned in downtown Chicago, destroying .

20th century

At the turn of the 20th century, Illinois had a population of nearly 5 million. Many people from other parts of the country were attracted to the state by employment caused by the expanding industrial base. Whites were 98% of the state's population. Bolstered by continued immigration from southern and eastern Europe, and by the African-American Great Migration from the South, Illinois grew and emerged as one of the most important states in the union. By the end of the century, the population had reached 12.4 million.

The Century of Progress World's fair was held at Chicago in 1933. Oil strikes in Marion County and Crawford County led to a boom in 1937, and by 1939, Illinois ranked fourth in U.S. oil production. Illinois manufactured 6.1 percent of total United States military armaments produced during World War II, ranking seventh among the 48 states. Chicago became an ocean port with the opening of the Saint Lawrence Seaway in 1959. The seaway and the Illinois Waterway connected Chicago to both the Mississippi River and the Atlantic Ocean. In 1960, Ray Kroc opened the first McDonald's franchise in Des Plaines (which still exists as a museum, with a working McDonald's across the street).

Illinois had a prominent role in the emergence of the nuclear age. In 1942, as part of the Manhattan Project, the University of Chicago conducted the first sustained nuclear chain reaction. In 1957, Argonne National Laboratory, near Chicago, activated the first experimental nuclear power generating system in the United States. By 1960, the first privately financed nuclear plant in the United States, Dresden 1, was dedicated near Morris. In 1967, Fermilab, a national nuclear research facility near Batavia, opened a particle accelerator, which was the world's largest for over 40 years. With eleven plants currently operating, Illinois leads all states in the amount of electricity generated from nuclear power.

In 1961, Illinois became the first state in the nation to adopt the recommendation of the American Law Institute and pass a comprehensive criminal code revision that repealed the law against sodomy. The code also abrogated common law crimes and established an age of consent of 18. The state's fourth constitution was adopted in 1970, replacing the 1870 document.

The first Farm Aid concert was held in Champaign to benefit American farmers, in 1985. The worst upper Mississippi River flood of the century, the Great Flood of 1993, inundated many towns and thousands of acres of farmland.

21st century
On August 28, 2017, Illinois Governor Bruce Rauner signed a bill into law that prohibited state and local police from arresting anyone solely due to their immigration status or due to federal detainers. Some fellow Republicans criticized Rauner for his action, claiming the bill made Illinois a sanctuary state.

Geology

During the early part of the Paleozoic Era, the area that would one day become Illinois was submerged beneath a shallow sea and located near the Equator. Diverse marine life lived at this time, including trilobites, brachiopods, and crinoids. Changing environmental conditions led to the formation of large coal swamps in the Carboniferous.

Illinois was above sea level for at least part of the Mesozoic, but by its end was again submerged by the Western Interior Seaway. This receded by the Eocene Epoch.

During the Pleistocene Epoch, vast ice sheets covered much of Illinois, with only the Driftless Area remaining exposed. These glaciers carved the basin of Lake Michigan and left behind traces of ancient glacial lakes and moraines.

Geography

Illinois is located in the Midwest region of the United States and is one of the eight states in the Great Lakes region of North America (which also includes Ontario, Canada).

Boundaries

Illinois's eastern border with Indiana consists of a north–south line at 87° 31′ 30″ west longitude in Lake Michigan at the north, to the Wabash River in the south above Post Vincennes. The Wabash River continues as the eastern/southeastern border with Indiana until the Wabash enters the Ohio River. This marks the beginning of Illinois's southern border with Kentucky, which runs along the northern shoreline of the Ohio River. Most of the western border with Missouri and Iowa is the Mississippi River; Kaskaskia is an exclave of Illinois, lying west of the Mississippi and reachable only from Missouri. The state's northern border with Wisconsin is fixed at 42° 30′ north latitude. The northeastern border of Illinois lies in Lake Michigan, within which Illinois shares a water boundary with the state of Michigan, as well as Wisconsin and Indiana.

Topography

Though Illinois lies entirely in the Interior Plains, it does have some minor variation in its elevation. In extreme northwestern Illinois, the Driftless Area, a region of unglaciated and therefore higher and more rugged topography, occupies a small part of the state. Southern Illinois includes the hilly areas around the Shawnee National Forest.

Other highlands include the Shawnee Hills in the south, and there is varying topography along its rivers; the Illinois River bisects the state northeast to southwest. The floodplain on the Mississippi River from Alton to the Kaskaskia River is known as the American Bottom.

Divisions

Illinois has three major geographical divisions. Northern Illinois is dominated by Chicago metropolitan area, or Chicagoland, which is the city of Chicago and its suburbs, and the adjoining exurban area into which the metropolis is expanding. As defined by the federal government, the Chicago metro area includes several counties in Illinois, Indiana, and Wisconsin, and has a population of over 9.8 million. Chicago itself is a cosmopolitan city, densely populated, industrialized, the transportation hub of the nation, and settled by a wide variety of ethnic groups. The Quad Cities region, located along the Mississippi River in northern Illinois, had a population of 381,342 in 2011.

The midsection of Illinois is the second major division, called Central Illinois. Historically prairie, it is now mainly agricultural and known as the Heart of Illinois. It is characterized by small towns and medium–small cities. The western section (west of the Illinois River) was originally part of the Military Tract of 1812 and forms the conspicuous western bulge of the state. Agriculture, particularly corn and soybeans, as well as educational institutions and manufacturing centers, figure prominently in Central Illinois. Cities include Peoria; Springfield, the state capital; Quincy; Decatur; Bloomington-Normal; and Champaign-Urbana.

The third division is Southern Illinois, comprising the area south of U.S. Route 50, including Little Egypt, near the juncture of the Mississippi River and Ohio River. Southern Illinois is the site of the ancient city of Cahokia, as well as the site of the first state capital at Kaskaskia, which today is separated from the rest of the state by the Mississippi River. This region has a somewhat warmer winter climate, different variety of crops (including some cotton farming in the past), more rugged topography (due to the area remaining unglaciated during the Illinoian Stage, unlike most of the rest of the state), as well as small-scale oil deposits and coal mining. The Illinois suburbs of St. Louis, such as East St. Louis, are located in this region, and collectively, they are known as the Metro-East. The other somewhat significant concentration of population in Southern Illinois is the Carbondale-Marion-Herrin, Illinois Combined Statistical Area centered on Carbondale and Marion, a two-county area that is home to 123,272 residents. A portion of southeastern Illinois is part of the extended Evansville, Indiana, Metro Area, locally referred to as the Tri-State with Indiana and Kentucky. Seven Illinois counties are in the area.

In addition to these three, largely latitudinally defined divisions, all of the region outside the Chicago metropolitan area is often called "downstate" Illinois. This term is flexible, but is generally meant to mean everything outside the influence of the Chicago area. Thus, some cities in Northern Illinois, such as DeKalb, which is west of Chicago, and Rockford—which is actually north of Chicago—are sometimes incorrectly considered to be 'downstate'.

Climate

Illinois has a climate that varies widely throughout the year. Because of its nearly 400-mile distance between its northernmost and southernmost extremes, as well as its mid-continental situation, most of Illinois has a humid continental climate (Köppen climate classification Dfa), with hot, humid summers and cold winters. The southern part of the state, from about Carbondale southward, has a humid subtropical climate (Koppen Cfa), with more moderate winters. This followed the previous record of  recorded on January 5, 1999, near Congerville.

Illinois averages approximately 51 days of thunderstorm activity a year, which ranks somewhat above average in the number of thunderstorm days for the United States. Illinois is vulnerable to tornadoes, with an average of 35 occurring annually, which puts much of the state at around five tornadoes per  annually. While tornadoes are no more powerful in Illinois than other states, some of Tornado Alley's deadliest tornadoes on record have occurred in the state. The Tri-State Tornado of 1925 killed 695 people in three states; 613 of the victims died in Illinois.

Urban areas

Chicago is the largest city in the state and the third-most populous city in the United States, with its 2020 population of 2,746,388. The U.S. Census Bureau currently lists seven other cities with populations of over 100,000 within Illinois. Based upon the U.S. Census Bureau's official 2010 population: Aurora, a Chicago satellite town that eclipsed Rockford for the title of second-most populous city in Illinois; its 2010 population was 197,899. Rockford, at 152,871, is the third-largest city in the state, and is the largest city in the state not located within the Chicago suburbs. Joliet, located in metropolitan Chicago, is the fourth-largest city in the state, with a population of 147,433. Naperville, a suburb of Chicago, is fifth with 141,853. Naperville and Aurora share a boundary along Illinois Route 59. Springfield, the state's capital, comes in as sixth-most populous with 117,352 residents. Peoria, which decades ago was the second-most populous city in the state, is seventh with 115,007. The eighth-largest and final city in the 100,000 club is Elgin, a northwest suburb of Chicago, with a 2010 population of 108,188.

The most populated city in the state south of Springfield is Belleville, with 44,478 people at the 2010 census. It is located in the Illinois portion of Greater St. Louis (often called the Metro-East area), which has a rapidly growing population of over 700,000.

Other major urban areas include the Champaign-Urbana Metropolitan Area, which has a combined population of almost 230,000 people, the Illinois portion of the Quad Cities area with about 215,000 people, and the Bloomington-Normal area with a combined population of over 165,000.

Demographics

The United States Census Bureau found that the population of Illinois was 12,812,508 in the 2020 United States census, moving from the fifth-largest state to the sixth-largest state (losing out to Pennsylvania). Illinois' population slightly declined in 2020 from the 2010 United States census by just over 18,000 residents and the overall population was quite higher than recent census estimates.

Illinois is the most populous state in the Midwest region. Chicago, the third-most populous city in the United States, is the center of the Chicago metropolitan area or Chicagoland, as this area is nicknamed. Although the Chicago metropolitan area comprises only 9% of the land area of the state, it contains 65% of the state's residents. The losses of population anticipated from the 2020 census results do not arise from the Chicago metro area; rather the declines are from the Downstate counties.

According to HUD's 2022 Annual Homeless Assessment Report, there were an estimated 9,212 homeless people in Illinois.

2019 American Community Survey

According to 2019 U.S. Census Bureau estimates, Illinois's population was 71.4% White (60.7% Non-Hispanic White), 5.6% Asian, 0.2% Some Other Race, 13.9% Black or African American, 0.1% Native Americans and Alaskan Native, 0.1% Pacific Islander and 2.0% from two or more races. The White population continues to remain the largest racial category in Illinois as Hispanics primarily identify as White (61.1%) with others identifying as Some Other Race (32.0%), Multiracial (4.3%), Black (1.4%), American Indian and Alaskan Native (0.2%), Asian (0.1%), and Hawaiian and Pacific Islander (0.1%). By ethnicity, 17.5% of the total population is Hispanic-Latino (of any race) and 82.5% is Non-Hispanic (of any race). If treated as a separate category, Hispanics are the largest minority group in Illinois.

The state's most populous ethnic group, non-Hispanic white, has declined from 83.5% in 1970 to 60.90% in 2018. , 49.4% of Illinois's population younger than age 1 were minorities (Note: Children born to white Hispanics or to a sole full or partial minority parent are counted as minorities).

At the 2007 estimates from the U.S. Census Bureau, there were 1,768,518 foreign-born inhabitants of the state or 13.8% of the population, with 48.4% from Latin America, 24.6% from Asia, 22.8% from Europe, 2.9% from Africa, 1.2% from Canada, and 0.2% from Oceania. Of the foreign-born population, 43.7% were naturalized U.S. citizens, and 56.3% were not U.S. citizens. In 2007, 6.9% of Illinois's population was reported as being under age 5, 24.9% under age 18 and 12.1% were age 65 and over. Females made up approximately 50.7% of the population.

According to the 2007 estimates, 21.1% of the population had German ancestry, 13.3% had Irish ancestry, 8% had British ancestry, 7.9% had Polish ancestry, 6.4% had Italian ancestry, 4.6% listed themselves as American, 2.4% had Swedish ancestry, 2.2% had French ancestry, other than Basque, 1.6% had Dutch ancestry, and 1.4% had Norwegian ancestry. Illinois also has large numbers of African Americans and Latinos (mostly Mexicans and Puerto Ricans).

Chicago, along the shores of Lake Michigan, is the nation's third largest city. In 2000, 23.3% of Illinois's population lived in the city of Chicago, 43.3% in Cook County, and 65.6% in the counties of the Chicago metropolitan area: Will, DuPage, Kane, Lake, and McHenry counties, as well as Cook County. The remaining population lives in the smaller cities and rural areas that dot the state's plains.

Birth data
Births do not add up, because Hispanics are counted both by ethnicity and by race.

Since 2016, data for births of White Hispanic origin are not collected, but included in one Hispanic group; persons of Hispanic origin may be of any race.

Languages

The official language of Illinois is English, although between 1923 and 1969, state law gave official status to "the American language". Nearly 80% of people in Illinois speak English natively, and most of the rest speak it fluently as a second language. A number of dialects of American English are spoken, ranging from Inland Northern American English and African-American English around Chicago, to Midland American English in Central Illinois, to Southern American English in the far south.

Over 20% of Illinoians speak a language other than English at home, of which Spanish is by far the most widespread, at more than 12% of the total population. A sizeable number of Polish speakers is present in the Chicago Metropolitan Area. Illinois Country French has mostly gone extinct in Illinois, although it is still celebrated in the French Colonial Historic District.

Religion

Christianity

Roman Catholics constitute the single largest religious denomination in Illinois; they are heavily concentrated in and around Chicago and account for nearly 30% of the state's population. However, taken together as a group, the various Protestant denominations comprise a greater percentage of the state's population than do Catholics. In 2010, Catholics in Illinois numbered 3,648,907. The largest Protestant denominations were the United Methodist Church with 314,461 members and the Southern Baptist Convention with 283,519. Illinois has one of the largest concentrations of Missouri Synod Lutherans in the United States.

Illinois played an important role in the early Latter Day Saint movement, with Nauvoo becoming a gathering place for Mormons in the early 1840s. Nauvoo was the location of the succession crisis, which led to the separation of the Mormon movement into several Latter Day Saint sects. The Church of Jesus Christ of Latter-day Saints, the largest of the sects to emerge from the Mormon schism, has more than 55,000 adherents in Illinois today.

Other Abrahamic religious communities

A significant number of adherents of other Abrahamic faiths can be found in Illinois. Largely concentrated in the Chicago metropolitan area, followers of the Muslim, Baháʼí, and Jewish religions all call the state home. Muslims constituted the largest non-Christian group, with 359,264 adherents. Illinois has the largest concentration of Muslims by state in the country, with 2,800 Muslims per 100,000 citizens.

The largest and oldest surviving Baháʼí House of Worship in the world is located on the shores of Lake Michigan in Wilmette, Illinois, one of eight continental Baháʼí House of Worship. It serves as a space for people of all backgrounds and religions to gather, meditate, reflect, and pray, expressing the Baháʼí principle of the oneness of religions. The Chicago area has a very large Jewish community, particularly in the suburbs of Skokie, Buffalo Grove, Highland Park, and surrounding suburbs. Former Chicago Mayor Rahm Emanuel was the Windy City's first Jewish mayor.

Other religions

Chicago is also home to a very large population of Hindus, Sikhs, Jains, and Buddhists.

Economy

As of 2022, the gross state product for Illinois reached  trillion.

As of February 2019, the unemployment rate in Illinois reached 4.2%.

Illinois's minimum wage will rise to $15 per hour by 2025, making it one of the highest in the nation.

Agriculture

Illinois's major agricultural outputs are corn, soybeans, hogs, cattle, dairy products, and wheat. In most years, Illinois is either the first or second state for the highest production of soybeans, with a harvest of 427.7 million bushels (11.64 million metric tons) in 2008, after Iowa's production of 444.82 million bushels (12.11 million metric tons). Illinois ranks second in U.S. corn production with more than 1.5 billion bushels produced annually. With a production capacity of 1.5 billion gallons per year, Illinois is a top producer of ethanol, ranking third in the United States in 2011. Illinois is a leader in food manufacturing and meat processing. Although Chicago may no longer be "Hog Butcher for the World", the Chicago area remains a global center for food manufacture and meat processing, with many plants, processing houses, and distribution facilities concentrated in the area of the former Union Stock Yards. Illinois also produces wine, and the state is home to two American viticultural areas. In the area of The Meeting of the Great Rivers Scenic Byway, peaches and apples are grown. The German immigrants from agricultural backgrounds who settled in Illinois in the mid- to late 19th century are in part responsible for the profusion of fruit orchards in that area of Illinois. Illinois's universities are actively researching alternative agricultural products as alternative crops.

Manufacturing

Illinois is one of the nation's manufacturing leaders, boasting annual value added productivity by manufacturing of over $107 billion in 2006. , Illinois is ranked as the 4th-most productive manufacturing state in the country, behind California, Texas, and Ohio. About three-quarters of the state's manufacturers are located in the Northeastern Opportunity Return Region, with 38 percent of Illinois's approximately 18,900 manufacturing plants located in Cook County. As of 2006, the leading manufacturing industries in Illinois, based upon value-added, were chemical manufacturing ($18.3 billion), machinery manufacturing ($13.4 billion), food manufacturing ($12.9 billion), fabricated metal products ($11.5 billion), transportation equipment ($7.4 billion), plastics and rubber products ($7.0 billion), and computer and electronic products ($6.1 billion).

Services

By the early 2000s, Illinois's economy had moved toward a dependence on high-value-added services, such as financial trading, higher education, law, logistics, and medicine. In some cases, these services clustered around institutions that hearkened back to Illinois's earlier economies. For example, the Chicago Mercantile Exchange, a trading exchange for global derivatives, had begun its life as an agricultural futures market. Other important non-manufacturing industries include publishing, tourism, and energy production and distribution.

Investments

Venture capitalists funded a total of approximately $62 billion in the U.S. economy in 2016. Of this amount, Illinois-based companies received approximately $1.1 billion. Similarly, in FY 2016, the federal government spent $461 billion on contracts in the U.S. Of this amount, Illinois-based companies received approximately $8.7 billion.

Energy

Illinois is a net importer of fuels for energy, despite large coal resources and some minor oil production. Illinois exports electricity, ranking fifth among states in electricity production and seventh in electricity consumption.

Coal

The coal industry of Illinois has its origins in the middle 19th century, when entrepreneurs such as Jacob Loose discovered coal in locations such as Sangamon County. Jacob Bunn contributed to the development of the Illinois coal industry, and was a founder and owner of the Western Coal & Mining Company of Illinois. About 68% of Illinois has coal-bearing strata of the Pennsylvanian geologic period. According to the Illinois State Geological Survey, 211 billion tons of bituminous coal are estimated to lie under the surface, having a total heating value greater than the estimated oil deposits in the Arabian Peninsula. However, this coal has a high sulfur content, which causes acid rain, unless special equipment is used to reduce sulfur dioxide emissions. Many Illinois power plants are not equipped to burn high-sulfur coal. In 1999, Illinois produced 40.4 million tons of coal, but only 17 million tons (42%) of Illinois coal was consumed in Illinois. Most of the coal produced in Illinois is exported to other states and countries. In 2008, Illinois exported three million tons of coal, and was projected to export nine million in 2011, as demand for energy grows in places such as China, India, and elsewhere in Asia and Europe. , Illinois was ranked third in recoverable coal reserves at producing mines in the nation. Most of the coal produced in Illinois is exported to other states, while much of the coal burned for power in Illinois (21 million tons in 1998) is mined in the Powder River Basin of Wyoming.

Mattoon was chosen as the site for the Department of Energy's FutureGen project, a 275-megawatt experimental zero emission coal-burning power plant that the DOE just gave a second round of funding. In 2010, after a number of setbacks, the city of Mattoon backed out of the project.

Petroleum

However, Illinois has very limited crude oil proved reserves that account for less than 1% of the U.S. total reserves. Residential heating is 81% natural gas compared to less than 1% heating oil.

Nuclear power

Nuclear power arguably began in Illinois with the Chicago Pile-1, the world's first artificial self-sustaining nuclear chain reaction in the world's first nuclear reactor, built on the University of Chicago campus. There are six operating nuclear power plants in Illinois: Braidwood, Byron, Clinton, Dresden, LaSalle, and Quad Cities. With the exception of the single-unit Clinton plant, each of these facilities has two reactors. Three reactors have been permanently shut down and are in various stages of decommissioning: Dresden-1 and Zion-1 and 2. Illinois ranked first in the nation in 2010 in both nuclear capacity and nuclear generation. Generation from its nuclear power plants accounted for 12 percent of the nation's total. In 2007, 48% of Illinois's electricity was generated using nuclear power. The Morris Operation is the only de facto high-level radioactive waste storage site in the United States.

Wind power

Illinois has seen growing interest in the use of wind power for electrical generation. Most of Illinois was rated in 2009 as "marginal or fair" for wind energy production by the U.S. Department of Energy, with some western sections rated "good" and parts of the south rated "poor". These ratings are for wind turbines with  hub heights; newer wind turbines are taller, enabling them to reach stronger winds farther from the ground. As a result, more areas of Illinois have become prospective wind farm sites. As of September 2009, Illinois had 1116.06 MW of installed wind power nameplate capacity with another 741.9 MW under construction. Illinois ranked ninth among U.S. states in installed wind power capacity, and sixteenth by potential capacity. Large wind farms in Illinois include Twin Groves, Rail Splitter, EcoGrove, and Mendota Hills.

As of 2007, wind energy represented only 1.7% of Illinois's energy production, and it was estimated that wind power could provide 5–10% of the state's energy needs. Also, the Illinois General Assembly mandated in 2007 that by 2025, 25% of all electricity generated in Illinois is to come from renewable resources.

Biofuels

Illinois is ranked second in corn production among U.S. states, and Illinois corn is used to produce 40% of the ethanol consumed in the United States. The Archer Daniels Midland corporation in Decatur, Illinois, is the world's leading producer of ethanol from corn.

The National Corn-to-Ethanol Research Center (NCERC), the world's only facility dedicated to researching the ways and means of converting corn (maize) to ethanol is located on the campus of Southern Illinois University Edwardsville.

University of Illinois Urbana-Champaign is one of the partners in the Energy Biosciences Institute (EBI), a $500 million biofuels research project funded by petroleum giant BP.

Taxes

Tax is collected by the Illinois Department of Revenue. State income tax is calculated by multiplying net income by a flat rate. In 1990, that rate was set at 3%, but in 2010, the General Assembly voted for a temporary increase in the rate to 5%; the new rate went into effect on January 1, 2011; the personal income rate partially sunset on January 1, 2015, to 3.75%, while the corporate income tax fell to 5.25%. Illinois failed to pass a budget from 2015 to 2017, after the 736-day budget impasse, a budget was passed in Illinois after lawmakers overturned Governor Bruce Rauner's veto; this budget raised the personal income rate to 4.95% and the corporate rate to 7%. There are two rates for state sales tax: 6.25% for general merchandise and 1% for qualifying food, drugs, and medical appliances. The property tax is a major source of tax revenue for local government taxing districts. The property tax is a local—not state—tax, imposed by local government taxing districts, which include counties, townships, municipalities, school districts, and special taxation districts. The property tax in Illinois is imposed only on real property.

On May 1, 2019, the Illinois Senate voted to approve a constitutional amendment that would have stricken language from the Illinois Constitution requiring a flat state income tax, in a 73–44 vote. If approved, the amendment would have allowed the state legislature to impose a graduated income tax based on annual income. The governor, J.B. Pritzker, approved the bill on May 27, 2019. It was scheduled for a 2020 general election ballot vote and required 60 percent voter approval to effectively amend the state constitution. The amendment was not approved by Illinoisans, with 55.1% of voters voting "No" on approval and 44.9% voting "Yes."

As of 2017 Chicago had the highest state and local sales tax rate for a U.S. city with a populations above 200,000, at 10.250%. The state of Illinois has the second highest rate of real estate tax: 2.31%, which is second only to New Jersey at 2.44%.

Toll roads are a de facto user tax on the citizens and visitors to the state of Illinois. Illinois ranks seventh out of the 11 states with the most miles of toll roads, at 282.1 miles. Chicago ranks fourth in most expensive toll roads in America by the mile, with the Chicago Skyway charging 51.2 cents per mile. Illinois also has the 11th highest gasoline tax by state, at 37.5 cents per gallon.

Culture

Museums

Illinois has numerous museums; the greatest concentration of these are in Chicago. Several museums in Chicago are ranked as some of the best in the world. These include the John G. Shedd Aquarium, the Field Museum of Natural History, the Art Institute of Chicago, the Adler Planetarium, and the Museum of Science and Industry.

The modern Abraham Lincoln Presidential Library and Museum in Springfield is the largest and most attended presidential library in the country. The Illinois State Museum boasts a collection of 13.5 million objects that tell the story of Illinois life, land, people, and art. The ISM is among only 5% of the nation's museums that are accredited by the American Alliance of Museums. Other historical museums in the state include the Polish Museum of America in Chicago; Magnolia Manor in Cairo; Easley Pioneer Museum in Ipava; the Elihu Benjamin Washburne; Ulysses S. Grant Homes, both in Galena; and the Chanute Air Museum, located on the former Chanute Air Force Base in Rantoul.

Music

Illinois is a leader in music education, having hosted the Midwest Clinic International Band and Orchestra Conference since 1946, as well being home to the Illinois Music Educators Association (ILMEA, formerly IMEA), one of the largest professional music educator's organizations in the country. Each summer since 2004, Southern Illinois University Carbondale has played host to the Southern Illinois Music Festival, which presents dozens of performances throughout the region. Past featured artists include the Eroica Trio and violinist David Kim.

Chicago, in the northeast corner of the state, is a major center for music in the midwestern United States where distinctive forms of blues (greatly responsible for the future creation of rock and roll), and house music, a genre of electronic dance music, were developed.

The Great Migration of poor black workers from the South into the industrial cities brought traditional jazz and blues music to the city, resulting in Chicago blues and "Chicago-style" Dixieland jazz. Notable blues artists included Muddy Waters, Junior Wells, Howlin' Wolf and both Sonny Boy Williamsons; jazz greats included Nat King Cole, Gene Ammons, Benny Goodman, and Bud Freeman. Chicago is also well known for its soul music.

In the early 1930s, Gospel music began to gain popularity in Chicago due to Thomas A. Dorsey's contributions at Pilgrim Baptist Church.

In the 1980s and 1990s, heavy rock, punk, and hip hop also became popular in Chicago. Orchestras in Chicago include the Chicago Symphony Orchestra, the Lyric Opera of Chicago, and the Chicago Sinfonietta.

Movies

John Hughes, who moved from Grosse Pointe to Northbrook, based many films of his in Chicago, and its suburbs. Ferris Bueller's Day Off, Home Alone, The Breakfast Club, and all his films take place in the fictional Shermer, Illinois (the original name of Northbrook was Shermerville, and Hughes's High School, Glenbrook North High School, is on Shermer Road). Most locations in his films include Glenbrook North, the former Maine North High School, the Ben Rose House in Highland Park, and the famous Home Alone house in Winnetka, Illinois.

Sports

Major league sports

As one of the United States' major metropolises, all major sports leagues have teams headquartered in Chicago.
Two Major League Baseball teams are located in the state. The Chicago Cubs of the National League play in the second-oldest major league stadium, Wrigley Field, and went the longest length of time without a championship in all of major American sport, from 1908 to 2016, when they won the World Series. The Chicago White Sox of the American League won the World Series in 2005, their first since 1917. They play on the city's south side at Guaranteed Rate Field.
The Chicago Bears football team has won nine total NFL Championships, the last occurring in Super Bowl XX on January 26, 1986.
The Chicago Bulls of the NBA is one of the most recognized basketball teams in the world, largely as a result of the efforts of Michael Jordan, who led the team to six NBA championships in eight seasons in the 1990s.
The Chicago Blackhawks of the NHL began playing in 1926, and became a member of the Original Six once the NHL dropped to that number of teams during World War II. The Blackhawks have won six Stanley Cups, most recently in 2015.
Chicago Fire FC is a member of MLS and has been one of the league's most successful and best-supported clubs since its founding in 1997, winning one league and four Lamar Hunt U.S. Open Cups in that timespan. The team played in Bridgeview, adjacent to Chicago from 2006 to 2019. The team now plays at Soldier Field in Chicago.
The Chicago Red Stars have played at the top level of U.S. women's soccer since their formation in 2009, except in the 2011 season. The team currently plays in the National Women's Soccer League, playing at SeatGeek Stadium, the Bridgeview venue it formerly shared with Fire FC.
The Chicago Sky have played in the Women's National Basketball Association (WNBA) since 2006. The Sky won their first WNBA Championship in 2021. They play at Wintrust Arena in Chicago.
The Chicago Bandits of the NPF, a women's softball league; have won four league titles, most recently in 2016. They play at Parkway Bank Sports Complex in Rosemont, Illinois in the Chicago area.

Minor league sports

Many minor league teams also call Illinois their home. They include:
The Bloomington Edge of the Indoor Football League
The Bloomington Flex of the Midwest Professional Basketball Association
The Chicago Dogs of the American Association of Professional Baseball
 Chicago Fire FC II of MLS Next Pro
The Chicago Wolves are an AHL team playing in the suburb of Rosemont
The Gateway Grizzlies of the Frontier League in Sauget, Illinois
The Kane County Cougars of the American Association
The Joliet Slammers of the Frontier League
The Peoria Chiefs of the Midwest League
The Peoria Rivermen are an SPHL team
The Rockford Aviators of the Frontier League
The Rockford IceHogs of the AHL
The Schaumburg Boomers of the Frontier League
The Southern Illinois Miners based out of Marion in the Frontier League
The Windy City Bulls, playing in the Chicago suburb of Hoffman Estates, of the NBA G League
The Windy City ThunderBolts of the Frontier League

College sports

The state features 13 athletic programs that compete in NCAA Division I, the highest level of U.S. college sports.

The two most prominent are the Illinois Fighting Illini and Northwestern Wildcats, both members of the Big Ten Conference and the only ones competing in one of the so-called "Power Five conferences". The Fighting Illini football team has won five national championships and three Rose Bowl Games, whereas the men's basketball team has won 17 conference seasons and played five Final Fours. Meanwhile, the Wildcats have won eight football conference championships and one Rose Bowl Game.

The Northern Illinois Huskies from DeKalb, Illinois compete in the Mid-American Conference winning four conference championships and earning a bid in the Orange Bowl along with producing Heisman candidate Jordan Lynch at quarterback. The Huskies are the state's only other team competing in the Football Bowl Subdivision, the top level of NCAA football.

Four schools have football programs that compete in the second level of Division I football, the Football Championship Subdivision (FCS). The Illinois State Redbirds (Normal, adjacent to Bloomington) and Southern Illinois Salukis (representing Southern Illinois University's main campus in Carbondale) are members of the Missouri Valley Conference (MVC) for non-football sports and the Missouri Valley Football Conference (MVFC). The Western Illinois Leathernecks (Macomb) are full members of the Summit League, which does not sponsor football, and also compete in the MVFC. The Eastern Illinois Panthers (Charleston) are members of the Ohio Valley Conference (OVC).

The city of Chicago is home to four Division I programs that do not sponsor football. The DePaul Blue Demons, with main campuses in Lincoln Park and the Loop, are members of the Big East Conference. The Loyola Ramblers, with their main campus straddling the Edgewater and Rogers Park community areas on the city's far north side, compete in the Atlantic 10 Conference. The UIC Flames, from the Near West Side next to the Loop, are in the MVC. The Chicago State Cougars, from the city's south side, are one of only two all-sports independents in Division I after leaving the Western Athletic Conference in 2022.

Finally, two non-football Division I programs are located downstate. The Bradley Braves (Peoria) are MVC members, and the SIU Edwardsville Cougars (in the Metro East region across the Mississippi River from St. Louis) compete in the OVC.

Former Chicago sports franchises

Folded teams

The city was formerly home to several other teams that either failed to survive or belonged to leagues that folded.
The Chicago Blitz, United States Football League 1983–1984
The Chicago Sting, North American Soccer League 1975–1984 and Major Indoor Soccer League
The Chicago Cougars, World Hockey Association 1972–1975
The Chicago Rockers, Continental Basketball Association
The Chicago Skyliners, American Basketball Association 2000–01
The Chicago Bruisers, Arena Football League 1987–1989
The Chicago Power, National Professional Soccer League 1984–2001
The Chicago Blaze, National Women's Basketball League
The Chicago Machine, Major League Lacrosse
The Chicago Whales of the Federal Baseball League, a rival league to Major League Baseball from 1914 to 1916
The Chicago American Giants of the Negro baseball league, 1910–1952
The Chicago Bruins of the National Basketball League, 1939–1942
The Chicago Studebaker Flyers of the NBL, 1942–43
The Chicago American Gears of the NBL, 1944–1947
The Chicago Stags of the Basketball Association of America, 1946–1950
The Chicago Majors of the American Basketball League, 1961–1963
The Chicago Express of the ECHL
The Chicago Enforcers of the XFL pro football league
The Chicago Fire, World Football League 1974
The Chicago Winds, World Football League 1975
The Chicago Hustle, Women's Professional Basketball League 1978–1981
The Chicago Mustangs, North American Soccer League 1966–1967
The Chicago Rush, Arena Football League 2001–2013
The Chicago Storm, American Professional Slo-Pitch League (APSPL), 1977-1978
The Chicago Nationwide Advertising, North American Softball League (NASL), 1980

Relocated teams

The NFL's Arizona Cardinals, who currently play in the Phoenix suburb of Glendale, Arizona, played in Chicago as the Chicago Cardinals, until moving to St. Louis, Missouri after the 1959 season. An NBA expansion team known as the Chicago Packers in 1961–1962, and as the Chicago Zephyrs the following year, moved to Baltimore after the 1962–1963 season. The franchise is now known as the Washington Wizards.

Professional sports teams outside Chicago

The Peoria Chiefs are a High-A minor league baseball team affiliated with the St. Louis Cardinals. The Schaumburg Boomers, Southern Illinois Miners, Gateway Grizzlies, Joliet Slammers and Windy City ThunderBolts all belong to the independent Frontier League. Additionally, the Kane County Cougars play in the American Association and the Lake County Fielders were members of the former North American League.

In addition to the Chicago Wolves, the AHL also has the Rockford IceHogs serving as the AHL affiliate of the Chicago Blackhawks. The second incarnation of the Peoria Rivermen plays in the SPHL.

Motor racing

Motor racing oval tracks at the Chicagoland Speedway in Joliet, the Chicago Motor Speedway in Cicero and the Gateway International Raceway in Madison, near St. Louis, have hosted NASCAR, CART, and IRL races, whereas the Sports Car Club of America, among other national and regional road racing clubs, have visited the Autobahn Country Club in Joliet, the Blackhawk Farms Raceway in South Beloit and the former Meadowdale International Raceway in Carpentersville. Illinois also has several short tracks and dragstrips. The dragstrip at Gateway International Raceway and the Route 66 Raceway, which sits on the same property as the Chicagoland Speedway, both host NHRA drag races.

Golf

Illinois features several golf courses, such as Olympia Fields, Medinah, Midlothian, Cog Hill, and Conway Farms, which have often hosted the BMW Championship, Western Open, and Women's Western Open.

Also, the state has hosted 13 editions of the U.S. Open (latest at Olympia Fields in 2003), six editions of the PGA Championship (latest at Medinah in 2006), three editions of the U.S. Women's Open (latest at The Merit Club), the 2009 Solheim Cup (at Rich Harvest Farms), and the 2012 Ryder Cup (at Medinah).

The John Deere Classic is a regular PGA Tour event played in the Quad Cities since 1971, whereas the Encompass Championship is a Champions Tour event since 2013. Previously, the LPGA State Farm Classic was an LPGA Tour event from 1976 to 2011.

Parks and recreation

The Illinois state parks system began in 1908 with what is now Fort Massac State Park, becoming the first park in a system encompassing more than 60 parks and about the same number of recreational and wildlife areas.

Areas under the protection of the National Park Service include: the Illinois and Michigan Canal National Heritage Corridor near Lockport, the Lewis and Clark National Historic Trail, the Lincoln Home National Historic Site in Springfield, the Mormon Pioneer National Historic Trail, the Trail of Tears National Historic Trail, the American Discovery Trail, and the Pullman National Monument. The federal government also manages the Shawnee National Forest and the Midewin National Tallgrass Prairie.

Law and politics

In a 2020 study, Illinois was ranked as the 4th easiest state for citizens to vote in.

State government

The government of Illinois, under the Constitution of Illinois, has three branches of government: executive, legislative and judicial. The executive branch is split into several statewide elected offices, with the governor as chief executive. Legislative functions are granted to the Illinois General Assembly. The judiciary is composed of the Supreme Court and lower courts.

The Illinois General Assembly is the state legislature, composed of the 118-member Illinois House of Representatives and the 59-member Illinois Senate. The members of the General Assembly are elected at the beginning of each even-numbered year. The Illinois Compiled Statutes (ILCS) are the codified statutes of a general and permanent nature.

The executive branch is composed of six elected officers and their offices as well as numerous other departments. The six elected officers are: Governor, Lieutenant Governor, Attorney General, Secretary of State, Comptroller, and Treasurer. The government of Illinois has numerous departments, agencies, boards and commissions, but the so-called code departments provide most of the state's services.

The Judiciary of Illinois is the unified court system of Illinois. It consists of the Supreme Court, Appellate Court, and Circuit Courts. The Supreme Court oversees the administration of the court system.

The administrative divisions of Illinois are counties, townships, precincts, cities, towns, villages, and special-purpose districts. The basic subdivision of Illinois are the 102 counties. Eighty-five of the 102 counties are in turn divided into townships and precincts. Municipal governments are the cities, villages, and incorporated towns. Some localities possess home rule, which allows them to govern themselves to a certain extent.

Party balance

Illinois is a Democratic stronghold. Historically, Illinois was a political swing state, with near-parity existing between the Republican and the Democratic parties. However, in recent elections, the Democratic Party has gained ground, and Illinois has come to be seen as a solid "blue" state in presidential campaigns. Votes from Chicago and most of Cook County have long been strongly Democratic. However, the "collar counties" (the suburbs surrounding Chicago's Cook County, Illinois), can be seen as moderate voting districts. College towns like Carbondale, Champaign, and Normal also lean Democratic.

Republicans continue to prevail in the rural areas of northern and central Illinois, as well as southern Illinois outside of East St. Louis. From 1920 until 1972, Illinois was carried by the victor of each of these 14 presidential elections. In fact, the state was long seen as a national bellwether, supporting the winner in every election in the 20th century, except for 1916 and 1976. By contrast, Illinois has trended more toward the Democratic party, and has voted for their presidential candidates in the last six elections; in 2000, George W. Bush became the first Republican to win the presidency without carrying either Illinois or Vermont. Local politician and Chicago resident Barack Obama easily won the state's 21 electoral votes in 2008, with 61.9% of the vote. In 2010, incumbent governor Pat Quinn was re-elected with 47% of the vote, while Republican Mark Kirk was elected to the Senate with 48% of the vote. In 2012, President Obama easily carried Illinois again, with 58% to Republican candidate Mitt Romney's 41%. In 2014, Republican Bruce Rauner defeated Governor Quinn 50% to 46% to become Illinois's first Republican governor in 12 years after being sworn in on January 12, 2015, while Democratic senator Dick Durbin was re-elected with 53% of the vote. In 2016, Hillary Clinton carried Illinois with 55% of the vote, and Tammy Duckworth defeated incumbent Mark Kirk 54% to 40%. George W. Bush and Donald Trump are the only Republican presidential candidates to win without carrying either Illinois or Vermont. In 2018, Democrat JB Pritzker defeated the incumbent Bruce Rauner for the governorship with 54% of the vote.

History of corruption

Politics in the state have been infamous for highly visible corruption cases, as well as for crusading reformers, such as governors Adlai Stevenson and James R. Thompson. In 2006, former governor George Ryan was convicted of racketeering and bribery, leading to a six-and-a-half-year prison sentence. In 2008, then-Governor Rod Blagojevich was served with a criminal complaint on corruption charges, stemming from allegations that he conspired to sell the vacated Senate seat left by President Barack Obama to the highest bidder. Subsequently, on December 7, 2011, Rod Blagojevich was sentenced to 14 years in prison for those charges, as well as perjury while testifying during the case, totaling 18 convictions. Blagojevich was impeached and convicted by the legislature, resulting in his removal from office. In the late 20th century, Congressman Dan Rostenkowski was imprisoned for mail fraud; former governor and federal judge Otto Kerner, Jr. was imprisoned for bribery; Secretary of State Paul Powell was investigated and found to have gained great wealth through bribes, and State Auditor of Public Accounts (Comptroller) Orville Hodge was imprisoned for embezzlement. In 1912, William Lorimer, the GOP boss of Chicago, was expelled from the U.S. Senate for bribery and in 1921, Governor Len Small was found to have defrauded the state of a million dollars.

U.S. presidential elections

Illinois has shown a strong presence in presidential elections. Three presidents have claimed Illinois as their political base when running for president: Abraham Lincoln, Ulysses S. Grant, and most recently Barack Obama. Lincoln was born in Kentucky, but he moved to Illinois at age 21. He served in the General Assembly and represented the 7th congressional district in the U.S. House of Representatives before his election to the presidency in 1860. Ulysses S. Grant was born in Ohio and had a military career that precluded settling down, but on the eve of the Civil War and approaching middle age, he moved to Illinois and thus utilized the state as his home and political base when running for president. Barack Obama was born in Hawaii and made Illinois his home after graduating from law school, and later represented Illinois in the U.S. Senate. He then became president in 2008, running as a candidate from his Illinois base.

Ronald Reagan was born in Illinois, in the city of Tampico, raised in Dixon, Illinois, and educated at Eureka College, outside Peoria. Reagan later moved to California during his young adulthood. He then became an actor, and later became California's Governor before being elected president.

Hillary Clinton was born and raised in the suburbs of Chicago and became the first woman to represent a major political party in the general election of the U.S. presidency. Clinton ran from a platform based in New York State.

African-American U.S. senators

Eleven African-Americans have served as members of the United States Senate. Of which three have represented Illinois, the most of any single state: Carol Moseley-Braun, Barack Obama, and Roland Burris, who was appointed to replace Obama after his election to the presidency. Moseley-Braun was the first African-American woman to become a U.S. Senator.

Political families

Three families from Illinois have played particularly prominent roles in the Democratic Party, gaining both statewide and national fame.

Stevenson

The Stevenson family, initially rooted in central Illinois and later based in the Chicago metropolitan area, has provided four generations of Illinois officeholders.
Adlai Stevenson I (1835–1914) was a Vice President of the United States, as well as a Congressman
Lewis Stevenson (1868–1929), son of Adlai, served as Illinois Secretary of State.
Adlai Stevenson II (1900–1965), son of Lewis, served as Governor of Illinois and as the U.S. Ambassador to the United Nations; he was also the Democratic party's presidential nominee in 1952 and 1956, losing both elections to Dwight Eisenhower.
Adlai Stevenson III (1930–2021), son of Adlai II, served ten years as a United States Senator.

Daley

The Daley family's powerbase was in Chicago.
Richard J. Daley (1902–1976) served as Mayor of Chicago from 1955 to his death.
Richard M. Daley (1942–), son of Richard J, was Chicago's longest-serving mayor, in office from 1989 to 2011.
William M. Daley (1948–), another son of Richard J, is a former White House Chief of Staff and has served in a variety of appointed positions.

Pritzker

The Pritzker family is based in Chicago and have played important roles in both the private and the public sectors.
Jay Pritzker (1922–1999), co-founder of Hyatt Hotel based in Chicago.
Penny Pritzker (born 1959), 38th United States Secretary of Commerce under President Barack Obama.
J.B. Pritzker (born 1965), current and 43rd governor of Illinois and co-founder of the Pritzker Group.

Education

Illinois State Board of education

The Illinois State Board of Education (ISBE) is autonomous of the governor and the state legislature, and administers public education in the state. Local municipalities and their respective school districts operate individual public schools, but the ISBE audits performance of public schools with the Illinois School Report Card. The ISBE also makes recommendations to state leaders concerning education spending and policies.

Primary and secondary schools

Education is compulsory for ages 7–17 in Illinois. Schools are commonly, but not exclusively, divided into three tiers of primary and secondary education: elementary school, middle school or junior high school, and high school. District territories are often complex in structure. Many areas in the state are actually located in two school districts—one for high school, the other for elementary and middle schools. And such districts do not necessarily share boundaries. A given high school may have several elementary districts that feed into it, yet some of those feeder districts may themselves feed into multiple high school districts.

Colleges and universities

Using the criterion established by the Carnegie Foundation for the Advancement of Teaching, there are eleven "National Universities" in the state.

The University of Chicago is continuously ranked as one of the world's top ten universities on various independent university rankings, and its Booth School of Business, along with Northwestern's Kellogg School of Management consistently rank within the top five graduate business schools in the country and top ten globally. The University of Illinois Urbana-Champaign is often ranked among the best engineering schools in the world and in United States.

, six of these rank in the "first tier" among the top 500 National Universities in the nation, as determined by the U.S. News & World Report rankings: the University of Chicago, Northwestern University, the University of Illinois Urbana-Champaign, Loyola University Chicago, the Illinois Institute of Technology, DePaul University, University of Illinois Chicago, Illinois State University, Southern Illinois University Carbondale, and Northern Illinois University.

Illinois also has more than twenty additional accredited four-year universities, both public and private, and dozens of small liberal arts colleges across the state. Additionally, Illinois supports 49 public community colleges in the Illinois Community College System.

School financing

Schools in Illinois are funded primarily by property taxes, based on state assessment of property values, rather than direct state contributions. Scholar Tracy Steffes has described Illinois public education as historically “inequitable,” a system where one of “the wealthiest of states” is “the stingiest in its support for education.” There have been several attempts to reform school funding in Illinois. The most notable attempt came in 1973 with the adoption of the Illinois Resource Equalizer Formula, a measure through which it was hoped funding could be collected and distributed to Illinois schools more equitably. However, opposition from affluent Illinois communities who objected to having to pay for the less well-off school districts (many of them Black majority communities, produced by redlining, white flight, and other “soft” segregation methods) resulted in the formula's abolition in the late 1980s.

Infrastructure

Transportation

Because of its central location and its proximity to the Rust Belt and Grain Belt, Illinois is a national crossroads for air, auto, rail, and truck traffic.

Airports

From 1962 until 1998, Chicago's O'Hare International Airport (ORD) was the busiest airport in the world, measured both in terms of total flights and passengers. While it was surpassed by Atlanta's Hartsfield in 1998 (as Chicago splits its air traffic between O'Hare and Midway airports, while Atlanta uses only one airport), with 59.3 million domestic passengers annually, along with 11.4 million international passengers in 2008, O'Hare consistently remains one of the two or three busiest airports globally, and in some years still ranks number one in total flights. It is a major hub for both United Airlines and American Airlines, and a major airport expansion project is currently underway. Midway Airport (MDW), which had been the busiest airport in the world at one point until it was supplanted by O'Hare as the busiest airport in 1962, is now the secondary airport in the Chicago metropolitan area and still ranks as one of the nation's busiest airports. Midway is a major hub for Southwest Airlines and services many other carriers as well. Midway served 17.3 million domestic and international passengers in 2008.

Rail

Illinois has an extensive passenger and freight rail transportation network. Chicago is a national Amtrak hub and in-state passengers are served by Amtrak's Illinois Service, featuring the Chicago to Carbondale Illini and Saluki, the Chicago to Quincy Carl Sandburg and Illinois Zephyr, and the Chicago to St. Louis Lincoln Service. Nearly every North American railway meets at Chicago, making it the largest and most active rail hub in the country. Extensive commuter rail is provided in the city proper and some immediate suburbs by the Chicago Transit Authority's 'L' system. One of the largest suburban commuter rail system in the United States, operated by Metra, uses existing rail lines to provide direct commuter rail access for hundreds of suburbs to the city and beyond.

In addition to the state's rail lines, the Mississippi River and Illinois River provide major transportation routes for the state's agricultural interests. Lake Michigan gives Illinois access to the Atlantic Ocean by way of the Saint Lawrence Seaway.

Interstate highway system

The Interstate Highways in Illinois are all segments of the Interstate Highway System that are owned and maintained by the state.

Illinois has the distinction of having the most primary (two-digit) interstates pass through it among all the 50 states with 13. Illinois also ranks third among the fifty states with the most interstate mileage, coming in after California and Texas, which are much bigger states in area.

Major U.S. Interstate highways crossing the state include: Interstate 24 (I-24), I-39, I-41, I-55, I-57, I-64, I-70, I-72, I-74, I-80, I-88, I-90, and I-94.

U.S. highway system

The Illinois Department of Transportation (IDOT) is responsible for maintaining the U.S Highways in Illinois. The system in Illinois consists of 21 primary highways.

Among the U.S. highways that pass through the state, the primary ones are: US 6, US 12, US 14, US 20, US 24, US 30, US 34, US 36, US 40, US 41, US 45, US 50, US 51, US 52, US 54, US 60, US 62, and US 67.

Gallery

See also 

Index of Illinois-related articles
List of people from Illinois
Outline of Illinois
USS Illinois, 4 ships

Notes

References

Further reading

External links 

 Illinois: State Resource Guide, from the Library of Congress

Illinois Office of Tourism
Illinois - State Energy Profile Overview U.S. Energy Information Administration (EIA)
State Fact Sheets: Illinois USDA's Economic Research Service
USGS Central Midwest Water Science Center

 
1818 establishments in the United States
Former French colonies
Midwestern United States
States and territories established in 1818
States of the United States
Contiguous United States